Mike Carney (born 13 April 1966 in Squamish, British Columbia) is a Canadian former alpine skier who competed in the 1988 Winter Olympics.

External links
 sports-reference.com
 

1966 births
Living people
Canadian male alpine skiers
Olympic alpine skiers of Canada
Alpine skiers at the 1988 Winter Olympics
People from Squamish, British Columbia
Sportspeople from British Columbia
20th-century Canadian people